Plzeň Zoo, (Zoologická a botanická zahrada města Plzně) is a Czech zoo, located in Plzeň in Czech Republic. After Liberec Zoo is the second oldest zoo in the Czech Republic, founded in 1926 on the river banks of the river Radbuza.

Plzen zoo has 40 species of animals from EEP European Endangered Species Programme and is responsible for the European studbook for Dwarf and Thick tailed Maki.

Gallery

References
Much of the content of this article comes from the equivalent Czech-language Wikipedia article. Retrieved on 10 December 2014. Some of the following references are cited by that Czech-language article:

External links

Plzen Zoo on zooinstitutes.com

Zoos in the Czech Republic
Buildings and structures in Plzeň
Tourist attractions in the Plzeň Region
1926 establishments in Czechoslovakia
Zoos established in 1926
20th-century architecture in the Czech Republic